Delosperma cooperi (syn. Mesembryanthemum cooperi), the trailing Iceplant, hardy iceplant or pink carpet, is a dwarf perennial plant native to South Africa. It forms a dense lawn with abundant, long-lasting flowers. These fleshy roots help provide the ability for the plants to recover and grow rapidly if a disturbance has occurred.

Description
The flowers are the most brilliant aspect of this plant, with the production of a great quantity of vermillion, magenta or pink flowers that often covers the entire site, hence the popular name "pink carpet". These abundant and long-lasting flowers remains in bloom from June to October. The plant is sun-loving, and thrives in very dry and hot environments. While it adapts well to various soil types, it will suffer under water stagnation, and thus prefers well drained soils, or even rocky terrain. University of Arkansas Research and Extension states these native habitat lack in competition with grasses, so as a result are mostly found in dry, salt-tolerant, rocky sites.

According to the New Mexico State University extension, the common name, "ice plant" is because "they have bladder-like hairs on the leaf surface that reflect and refract light in a manner to make it appear that they sparkle like ice crystals" (or tiny glass beads). However, many other species of succulent so-called "ice plant" ground covers have smooth and hairless leaves.

Cultivation and uses
It can be cultivated in a wide range of areas with a Mediterranean climate. The leaves turn red in cold winter temperatures. Due to the low need for maintenance, it is suitable for urban environments and high temperature regions. It can often be found in large, extensive patches. The trailing stems also make it suitable for flowerpots and terraces.

Propagation can be accomplished by taking a flowerless cutting, stripping a couple of bottom leaves off, and then replanting in the same soil.

The plant contains the hallucinogen chemicals DMT and 5-MeO-DMT, which can be extracted from the leaves. The concentration of these chemicals varies over the year. The content of 5-MeO-DMT rises during the summer and the content of DMT instead rises during the winter.

In South Africa, Delosperma cooperi is used for preparation of khadi, an alcoholic wine. The plant's roots are known to be involved in the process of fermentation but the leaves are the important source for the production of khadi. There is no scientific evidence behind claims of medicinal benefits. It is known that the interaction of the plant during the fermentation process results in chemical components to change, which converts sugar to oxalic acid and is extremely toxic when ingested.

The plant is also used among the Bantu and the Europeans as yeast source for making beer.

Sources

Leistner, O. A. (ed.). 2000. Seed plants of southern Africa: families and genera. Strelitzia 10. National Botanical Institute, Pretoria.
Smith, G. F.; Chesselet, P.; Van Jaarsveld, E. J.; Hartmann, H.; Hammer, S.; Van Wyk, B.-E.; Burgoyne, P.; Klak, C.; & Kurzweil, H. 1998. Mesembs of the world. Briza Publications, Pretoria.

References

cooperi
Entheogens
Taxa named by Louisa Bolus
Taxa named by Joseph Dalton Hooker